Jüri Okas (born 26 August 1950 in Tallinn) is a notable Estonian architect, installation artist and printmaker.

From 1957 to 1968 Jüri Okas studied in the 46th Secondary School of Tallinn (today's Pelgulinna Gymnasium of Tallinn). From 1968 to 1970 he studied in the Tallinn Polytechnic Institute (today's Tallinn Technical University). From 1970 Jüri Okas studied in the State Art Institute of the Estonian SSR (today's Estonian Academy of Arts) in the department of architecture. He graduated from the institute in 1974.

From 1974 to 1989 Jüri Okas worked in the design bureau EKE Projekt. From 1989 he has worked in the architectural bureau Okas&Lõoke OÜ.

Most notable works by Jüri Okas are the gas station in Paide, the main building of Forekspank bank, the modern farm in Saaremaa and the Delta Plaza office building in Tallinn.

The art creation by Jüri Okas includes numerous performances, photo collages, prints, installations, book designs and sculptures. Exhibitions of his works have been on display in many Estonian and Finnish galleries and his works have been part of exhibitions in Estonia, Latvia, Lithuania, Finland, Sweden, Germany, Italy, Spain, Canada and Scotland.

Jüri Okas is the son of painter Evald Okas.

Works
Astlanda business center, 1992 (unbuilt, with Marika Lõoke)
Main office of the Forekspank bank, 1997 (with Marika Lõoke)
Estconde business center, 1999 (with Marika Lõoke)
Office building in the city center of Tallinn, 2001 (with Marika Lõoke)
Modern farm in Saaremaa, 2002
Apartment building on Kaarli Road, 2004 (with Marika Lõoke)
Apartment building on Rävala Road, 2005 (with Marika Lõoke)
Delta Plaza business center, 2008 (with Marika Lõoke)

Art
Reconstruction O, print, 1974
Reconstruction M, print, 1976
Environment, installation, 1976, Tallinn
Untitled, land art, 1979, Vääna-Jõesuu
Perspective, installation, 1979, Harku
Landscape II, print, 1982
Torn I, sügavtrükk, 1986
Nest, installation, 1987, Tallinn
Cross-roads, installation, 1995, Tartu
Drench to Heaven, installation, 1996, Rostock

References

Union of Estonian Architects, members
Museum of Evald Okas, family, Jüri Okas
Architectural Bureau Okas&Lõoke OÜ, works

1950 births
Living people
Tallinn University of Technology alumni
Architects from Tallinn